William Nyrén (March  19, 1920 – November 14, 1991) was a Norwegian actor. He appeared in stage roles in Oslo and in films.

Nyrén was born in Oslo. He was imprisoned in Sachsenhausen, Germany, during the Second World War. After returning home, he was engaged with the newly launched Studio Theater until 1952. He also had several roles for NRK's Radio Theater and Television Theater, and he was a regular at the National Traveling Theater from 1954 to 1966. Throughout the 1970s, he performed roles at the National Theater and the Norwegian Theater.

He was the father of the guitarist Nils Petter Nyrén (born 1947).

Filmography

 1946: Englandsfarere as Heydner
 1955: Trost i taklampa as Hjalmar
 1966: Afrikaneren
 1967: Den lange reisen hjem (TV)
 1968: De ukjentes marked as Nytorvet, a homeless man
 1970: Døden i gatene
 1971: Helten på den grøne øya (TV) as Jimmy Farrel
 1975: Min Marion as a tenant
 1980: Nedtur as Åge
 1981: Sølvmunn as a policeman

References

External links
 
 William Nyrén at Sceneweb
 William Nyrén at Filmfront

1920 births
1991 deaths
20th-century Norwegian male actors
Male actors from Oslo